Weston Bend State Park is a public recreation area on the east bank of the Missouri River in Platte County, Missouri. The state park's  include scenic river views, trails for hiking and biking, picnicking facilities, and a campground.

References

External links

Weston Bend State Park Missouri Department of Natural Resources
Weston Bend State Park Map Missouri Department of Natural Resources

State parks of Missouri
Protected areas of Platte County, Missouri
Protected areas established in 1980